Kestratherina is a genus of silversides endemic to the eastern Indian Ocean off southern Australia.

Species
The currently recognized species in this genus are:
 Kestratherina brevirostris (A. Pavlov, Ivantsoff, Last & Crowley, 1988) (short-snout hardyhead)
 Kestratherina esox (Klunzinger, 1872) (pikehead hardyhead)

References

Atherininae